Musical Minds is a Nova documentary based on neurologist Oliver Sacks's 2007 book Musicophilia: Tales of Music and the Brain about music and the human brain aired on June 30, 2009 on Public Broadcasting Service (PBS).

The documentary features blind piano savant Derek Paravicini, Matt Giordano and Tony Cicoria.

References

External links
Official website PBS
"Our Brains on Music: The Science" The New York Times TV review June 29. 2009.

2009 American television episodes
Documentary films about science
Nova (American TV program) episodes
PBS original programming
Television series by WGBH
Documentary films about music and musicians